Pt. Govind Ballabh Pant High Altitude Zoo is a high altitude zoo situated in Nainital, Kumaon. It is the only High Altitude Zoo in north India, besides those in Darjeeling and Sikkim. Over the years it has become a popular tourist attraction

History
The zoo was established in 1984, though it was opened to visitors on 1 June 1995.

The Naintal Zoo was home to India's only Siberian tiger from 2001 until its death in November 2011. The tiger, named Kunal, was half of a pair of tigers brought from Darjeeling in 1997. His older brother, named Mahesh, died in 2001.

Overview
The zoo has several endangered species of animals in the Himalayas, and animals like Royal Bengal tiger, Tibetan wolves, sambar, leopard cat and Himalayan bear. It also has a vast collection of high altitude birds, like kalij pheasant, Lady Amherst pheasant, rose ringed parakeet, golden pheasant and red junglefowl.

The zoo has night shelters for the animals, and curtains are put up in the bird enclosures during the winter months

Geography
It has a forest cover of evergreen oak, cupressus, and two other species of oak.

Transport
The zoo is located about  uphill from Tallital Bus station in Nainital. There is a steep motorable road leading to the zoo, though many tourist walk up the hill.

The zoo is open, Friday to Wednesday, 10.00 am - 4.30 p.m.

References

External links

Zoos in India
Nainital
1984 establishments in Uttar Pradesh
Tourist attractions in Uttarakhand
Zoos established in 1984